Senator Schmidt may refer to:

Art Schmidt (1927–2018), Kentucky State Senate
Carl Schmidt (politician) (1835–1888), Wisconsin State Senate
Charles J. Schmidt (1907–1966), Wisconsin State Senate
Dan Schmidt (born 1954), Idaho State Senate
Derek Schmidt (born 1968), Kansas State Senate
Helmut Schmidt (1918–2015), Senate of Hamburg
Suzi Schmidt (fl. 1970s–2010s), Illinois State Senate
Trudi Schmidt (born 1938), member of the Montana Legislature
Vicki Schmidt (born 1955), Kansas Insurance Commissioner
Wayne Schmidt (born 1966), Michigan State Senate
William A. Schmidt (1902–1992), Wisconsin State Senate

See also
Senator Schmitt (disambiguation)
Senator Schmitz (disambiguation)